Samantha Weinberg is a British novelist, journalist and travel writer. Educated at St Paul's Girls' School and Trinity College, Cambridge, she is the author of books such as A Fish Caught in Time: The Search for the Coelacanth and the James Bond inspired trilogy The Moneypenny Diaries under the alias Kate Westbrook. Since 2019, she has been a contributor to Tortoise Media.

Writing
In 1994 Weinberg wrote Last of the Pirates: in search of Bob Denard about French mercenary Bob Denard. In 1995, she spent three months travelling in the United States with Daisy Waugh.

In 2003 she won the CWA Gold Dagger for Non-Fiction for her book Pointing from the Grave: a True Story of Murder and DNA, about the murder of biotechnologist Helena Greenwood in California in 1985 and the pioneering use of DNA profiling in tracing her killer 15 years later.

The Moneypenny Diaries
When Weinberg's agent, Gillon Aitken, was appointed the literary adviser to Ian Fleming Publications, she and Aitken pitched their idea for a series of James Bond novels centred on the character of Miss Moneypenny, M's personal secretary. The series, referred to as The Moneypenny Diaries, is a trilogy with three books and two short stories currently published under the alias of Moneypenny's editor, Kate Westbrook.

 The Moneypenny Diaries: Guardian Angel (2005)
 "For Your Eyes Only, James" (2006 short story)
 Secret Servant: The Moneypenny Diaries (2006)
 "Moneypenny's First Date With Bond" (2006 short story)
 The Moneypenny Diaries: Final Fling (2008)

Politics
In 2010 Weinberg became the Green Party candidate for the new seat of Chippenham in Wiltshire, standing under her married name.

Personal life
Weinberg is married to filmmaker Mark Fletcher. She currently resides in Wiltshire, England. She has two children.

References

External links
Samantha Weinberg Author Profile HarperCollins Publishers
Samantha Weinberg Interview CommanderBond.net
Centenary Exclusive: Interview With Money-penny Diaries Author Samantha Weinberg Double O Section, May 2008
MI6.co.uk Samantha Weinberg Interview MI6 - The Home of James Bond 007, 19 November 2005

Alumni of Trinity College, Cambridge
English women novelists
English travel writers
British women travel writers
Year of birth missing (living people)
Living people
Green Party of England and Wales parliamentary candidates
People educated at St Paul's Girls' School
21st-century British novelists
English women journalists
21st-century English women writers
English women non-fiction writers
20th-century English women writers